Into the Woods is a 1987 musical with music and lyrics by Stephen Sondheim and book by James Lapine.

The musical intertwines the plots of several Brothers Grimm fairy tales, exploring the consequences of the characters' wishes and quests. The main characters are taken from "Little Red Riding Hood" (spelled "Ridinghood" in the published vocal score), "Jack and the Beanstalk", "Rapunzel", and "Cinderella", as well as several others. The musical is tied together by a story involving a childless baker and his wife and their quest to begin a family (the original beginning of the Grimm Brothers' "Rapunzel"), their interaction with a witch who has placed a curse on them, and their interaction with other storybook characters during their journey.

The musical debuted in San Diego at the Old Globe Theatre in 1986 and premiered on Broadway on November 5, 1987, where it won three major Tony Awards (Best Score, Best Book, and Best Actress in a Musical for Joanna Gleason), in a year dominated by The Phantom of the Opera (1988). The musical has since been produced many times, with a 1988 US national tour, a 1990 West End production, a 1997 tenth anniversary concert, a 2002 Broadway revival, a 2010 London revival, and in 2012 as part of New York City's outdoor Shakespeare in the Park series.

A Disney film adaptation, directed by Rob Marshall, was released in 2014. The film grossed over $213 million worldwide, and received three nominations at both the Academy Awards and the Golden Globe Awards.

A second Broadway revival began performances on June 28, 2022 at the St. James Theatre, and opened on July 10. The production closed on January 8, 2023 and began touring the U.S. on February 18 of the same year.

Synopsis

Act 1
The Narrator introduces four groups of characters: Cinderella, who wishes to attend the King's festival; Jack who wishes his cow, Milky White, would give milk; a Baker and his Wife, who wish to have a child; and Little Red Ridinghood, who wishes for bread to bring for her Granny.

The Baker's neighbor, an ugly old Witch, reveals the couple is infertile from a curse she cast on his father for stealing her vegetables, including magic beans. The Witch took the baker’s father’s child, Rapunzel. She explains the curse will be lifted if she is brought four ingredients – "the cow as white as milk, the cape as red as blood, the hair as yellow as corn, and the slipper as pure as gold" – in three days' time. All begin the journey into the woods: Jack to sell his beloved cow; Cinderella to her mother's grave; Little Red to her Grandmother's house; and the Baker, refusing his Wife's help, to find the ingredients ("Prologue").

Cinderella receives a gown and golden slippers from her mother's spirit ("Cinderella at the Grave"). A Mysterious Man mocks Jack for valuing his cow more than a "sack of beans". Little Red meets a hungry Wolf, who persuades her to take a longer path and admire the beauty, with his own ulterior motives in mind. ("Hello, Little Girl") The Baker, followed by his Wife, meets Jack. They convince Jack that the beans found in the Baker's father's jacket are magic and trade them for the cow; Jack bids Milky White a tearful farewell ("I Guess This Is Goodbye"). The Baker has qualms about their deceit, but his wife reassures him ("Maybe They're Magic").

The Witch has raised Rapunzel in a tall tower accessible only by climbing Rapunzel's long, golden hair ("Our Little World"); a Prince spies Rapunzel. The Baker, in pursuit of the red cape ("Maybe They're Magic" Reprise), slays the Wolf and rescues Little Red and her Granny. Little Red rewards him with her cape, and reflects on her experiences ("I Know Things Now"). Jack's Mother tosses his beans aside, which grow into an enormous stalk. Cinderella flees the Festival, pursued by another Prince, and the Baker's Wife hides her; asked about the ball, Cinderella is unimpressed ("A Very Nice Prince"). Spotting Cinderella's gold slippers, the Baker's Wife chases her and loses Milky White. The characters recite morals as the day ends ("First Midnight").

Jack describes his adventure climbing the beanstalk ("Giants in the Sky"). He gives the Baker gold stolen from the giants to buy back his cow, and returns up the beanstalk to find more; the Mysterious Man steals the money. Cinderella's Prince and Rapunzel's Prince, who are brothers, compare their unobtainable amours ("Agony"). The Baker's Wife overhears their talk of a girl with golden hair. She fools Rapunzel and takes a piece of her hair. The Mysterious Man returns Milky White to the Baker.

The Baker's Wife again fails to seize Cinderella's slippers. The Baker admits they must work together ("It Takes Two"). Jack arrives with a hen that lays golden eggs, but Milky White keels over dead as midnight chimes ("Second Midnight"). The Witch discovers the Prince's visits and demands Rapunzel stay sheltered from the world ("Stay with Me"). She refuses, and the Witch cuts off Rapunzel's hair and banishes her. The Mysterious Man gives the Baker money for another cow. Jack meets Little Red, now sporting a wolf skin cape and knife. She goads him into returning to the Giant's home to retrieve the Giant's harp.

Cinderella, torn between staying with her Prince or escaping, leaves him a slipper as a clue ("On the Steps of the Palace"), and trades shoes with the Baker's Wife. The Baker arrives with another cow; they now have all four items. A great crash is heard, and Jack's Mother reports a dead Giant in her backyard, which no one seems to care about. Jack returns with a magic harp. The Witch discovers the new cow is useless, and resurrects Milky White, who is fed the ingredients but fails to give milk. The Witch explains Rapunzel's hair will not work, and the Mysterious Man offers corn silk instead; Milky White produces the potion. The Witch reveals the Mysterious Man is the Baker's father, and she drinks – he falls dead, the curse is broken, and the Witch regains her youth and beauty.

Cinderella's Prince seeks the girl who fits the slipper; Cinderella’s desperate stepsisters mutilate their feet ("Careful My Toe"). Cinderella succeeds and becomes his bride. Rapunzel bears twins and is found by her Prince. The Witch finds her, and attempts to claim her back, but the Witch's powers are gone. At Cinderella's wedding, her stepsisters are blinded by birds, and the Baker's Wife, very pregnant, thanks Cinderella for her help ("So Happy" Prelude). Congratulating themselves on living happily "Ever After," the characters fail to notice another beanstalk growing.

Act 2
The Narrator continues, "Once Upon a Time... Later." Everyone still has wishes—the Baker and his Wife face new frustrations with their infant son, newly rich Jack misses the kingdom in the sky, Cinderella is bored with life in the palace ("So Happy")--but they are relatively content.

With a tremendous crash, a Giant's foot destroys the Witch's garden, and damages the Baker's home. The Baker travels to the palace, but his warning is ignored by the Prince's Steward, and by Jack's Mother. Returning home, he finds Little Red on her way to Granny's; he and his Wife escort her. Jack decides to slay the new Giant and Cinderella investigates her mother's disturbed grave. Everyone returns to the woods, but now "the skies are strange, the winds are strong" ("Into the Woods" Reprise).

Rapunzel, driven mad, also flees to the woods. Her Prince follows and meets his brother; they confess their lust for two new women, Snow White and Sleeping Beauty ("Agony" Reprise).

The Baker, his Wife, and Little Red find Cinderella's family and the Steward, who reveal the castle was set upon by the Giant. The Witch brings news that the Giant destroyed the village and the Baker's house. The Giantess – widow of the Giant Jack killed – appears, seeking revenge. As a sacrifice, the group offer up the Narrator, who is killed. Jack's Mother defends her son, angering the Giantess, and the Steward silences Jack's Mother, inadvertently killing her. As the Giantess leaves in search of Jack, Rapunzel is trampled ("Witch's Lament").

The Royal Family flee despite the Baker's pleas to stay and fight. The Witch vows to find Jack and give him to the Giantess, and the Baker and his Wife split up to find him first. Cinderella's Prince seduces the Baker's Wife ("Any Moment"). The Baker finds and convinces Cinderella to join their group. The Baker's Wife reflects on her adventure and tryst with the Prince ("Moments in the Woods"), but stumbles into the path of the Giantess and is killed.

The Baker, Little Red, and Cinderella await the return of the Baker's Wife when the Witch arrives with Jack, found weeping over the Baker's Wife's body. The Baker turns against Jack, and the two, along with Cinderella and Little Red start to blame each other before the four turn on the Witch ("Your Fault"). Chastising their inability to accept the consequences of their own actions, the Witch throws her remaining beans and is struck by another curse and vanishes ("Last Midnight").

Grief-stricken, the Baker flees, but is convinced by his father's un-dead spirit to face his responsibilities ("No More"). He returns and lays out a plan to kill the Giantess. Cinderella stays behind with the Baker's child and confronts her Prince over his infidelity; he explains his feelings of unfulfillment and that he wasn't raised to be sincere, and she asks him to leave.

Little Red discovers her Granny has been killed by the Giantess, as the Baker tells Jack that his mother is dead. Jack vows to kill the Steward but the Baker dissuades him, while Cinderella comforts Little Red. The Baker and Cinderella explain that choices have consequences, and everyone is connected ("No One Is Alone").

The four together slay the Giantess, and the other characters – including the Royal Family, who have starved to death, and the Princes with their new paramours (Sleeping Beauty and Snow White) – return to share one last set of morals. The survivors band together, and the spirit of the Baker's Wife comforts her mourning husband, encouraging him to tell their child their story. The Baker begins to tell his son the tale, while the Witch offers a final lesson: "Careful the things you say, Children Will Listen" ("Finale").

Musical numbers

 Act I
 Prologue: "Into the Woods" – Narrator, Cinderella, Jack, Baker, Baker's Wife, Cinderella’s Stepmother, Florinda, Lucinda, Jack's Mother, Little Red Ridinghood, Witch, Cinderella's Father
 "Cinderella at the Grave" – Narrator, Cinderella, Cinderella's Mother
 "Hello, Little Girl" – Wolf, Little Red Ridinghood
 "I Guess This Is Goodbye" – Jack
 "Maybe They're Magic" – Baker's Wife, Baker
 "Our Little World" – Witch, Rapunzel**
 "Maybe They're Magic" (reprise) – Baker*
 "I Know Things Now" – Little Red Ridinghood
 "A Very Nice Prince" – Cinderella, Baker's Wife
 "First Midnight" – Company
 "Giants in the Sky" – Jack
 "Agony" – Cinderella's Prince, Rapunzel's Prince
 "A Very Nice Prince" (reprise) – Cinderella, Baker’s Wife*
 "It Takes Two" – Baker’s Wife, Baker
 "Second Midnight" – Witch, Cinderella, Cinderella’s Prince, Rapunzel’s Prince, Cinderella’s Stepmother, Florinda, Lucinda, Granny, Narrator*
 "Stay with Me" – Witch, Rapunzel
 "On the Steps of the Palace" – Cinderella
 "Careful My Toe" – Narrator, Florinda, Cinderella’s Stepmother, Lucinda, Cinderella's Mother, Cinderella's Prince, Cinderella's Father*
 "So Happy" (Prelude) – Cinderella, Cinderella's Prince, Baker, Baker's Wife*
 "Ever After" – Narrator, Florinda, Lucinda, Witch, Company

 Act II
 Prologue: "So Happy" – Narrator, Cinderella, Jack, Baker, Baker's Wife, Cinderella's Prince, Jack's Mother, Cinderella’s Stepmother, Florinda, Lucinda, Witch
 Prologue: "Into the Woods" (reprise) - Baker, Baker's Wife, Jack, Little Red Ridinghood, Cinderella, Rapunzel
 "Agony" (reprise) – Cinderella's Prince, Rapunzel's Prince
 "Lament" – Witch
 "Any Moment" – Cinderella's Prince, Baker's Wife
 "Moments in the Woods" – Baker's Wife
 "Your Fault" – Jack, Baker, Witch, Cinderella, Little Red Ridinghood
 "Last Midnight" – Witch, Cinderella, Little Red Ridinghood, Baker
 "No More" – Baker, Mysterious Man
 "No One Is Alone" – Cinderella, Little Red Ridinghood, Baker, Jack
 Finale: "Midnight" - Jack’s Mother, Mysterious Man, Cinderella’s Prince, Rapunzel’s Prince, Sleeping Beauty, Snow White, Steward, Cinderella's Stepmother, Cinderella’s Father, Florinda, Lucinda, Granny, Rapunzel
 Finale: "No One Is Alone" (reprise) - Baker, Baker's Wife
 Finale: "Children Will Listen" - Baker, Witch, Company
 Finale: "Into the Woods" (reprise 2) – Baker, Cinderella, Little Red Ridinghood, Jack, Company

*Not included in the original Broadway cast recording
**Added for the 1990 London production

Productions

Pre-Broadway San Diego production
Into the Woods premiered at the Old Globe Theatre in San Diego, California, on December 4, 1986, and ran for 50 performances, under the direction of James Lapine. Many of the performers from that production appeared in the Broadway cast, except for John Cunningham as the Narrator/Wolf/Steward, George Coe as the Mysterious Man/Cinderella's Father, Kenneth Marshall as Cinderella's Prince, LuAnne Ponce as Little Red Ridinghood, and Ellen Foley as the Witch. Kay McClelland who played both Rapunzel and the Stepsister Florinda went with the cast to Broadway but only played Florinda.

The show evolved, and the most notable change was the addition of the song "No One Is Alone" in the middle of the run. Because of this, the finale was also altered. It originally was "Midnight/Ever After (reprise)/It Takes Two (reprise)/Into the Woods (reprise 2)" but it eventually evolved into how it currently is. Another notable change was originally during the finale the Baker and Cinderella would become a couple and kiss before singing the reprise of "It Takes Two".

Original Broadway production
Into the Woods opened on Broadway at the Martin Beck Theatre on November 5, 1987, and closed on September 3, 1989, after 765 performances. It starred Bernadette Peters as the Witch, Joanna Gleason as the Baker’s Wife, Chip Zien as the Baker, Robert Westenberg as the Wolf/Cinderella’s Prince, Tom Aldredge as the Narrator/Mysterious Man, Kim Crosby as Cinderella, Danielle Ferland as Little Red Ridinghood, Ben Wright as Jack, Chuck Wagner as Rapunzel’s Prince, Barbara Bryne as Jack’s Mother, Pamela Winslow as Rapunzel, Merle Louise as Cinderella’s Mother/Granny/Giant’s Wife, Edmund Lyndeck as Cinderella’s Father, Joy Franz as Cinderella’s Stepmother, Philip Hoffman as the Steward, Lauren Mitchell as Lucinda, Kay McClelland as Florinda, Jean Kelly as Snow White, and Maureen Davis as Sleeping Beauty. It was directed by James Lapine, with musical staging by Lar Lubovitch, settings by Tony Straiges, lighting by Richard Nelson, costumes by Ann Hould-Ward (based on original concepts by Patricia Zipprodt and Ann Hould-Ward), and makeup by Jeff Raum. The original production won the 1988 New York Drama Critics' Circle Award and the Drama Desk Award for Best Musical, and the original cast recording won a Grammy Award. The show was nominated for ten Tony Awards, and won three: Best Score (Stephen Sondheim), Best Book (James Lapine) and Best Actress in a Musical (Joanna Gleason).

Peters left the show after almost five months due to a prior commitment to film the movie Slaves of New York. The Witch was then played by: Betsy Joslyn (from March 30, 1988); Phylicia Rashad (from April 14, 1988); Betsy Joslyn (from July 5, 1988); Nancy Dussault (from December 13, 1988); and Ellen Foley (from August 1, 1989, until the closing). Understudies for the part included Joslyn, Marin Mazzie, Lauren Vélez, Suzzanne Douglas, and Joy Franz.

Other cast replacements included Dick Cavett as the Narrator (as of July 19, 1988) (for a temporary engagement after which Tom Aldredge returned), Edmund Lyndeck as the Mysterious Man, Patricia Ben Peterson as Cinderella, LuAnne Ponce returning to the role of Little Red Ridinghood, Jeff Blumenkrantz as Jack, Marin Mazzie as Rapunzel (as of March 7, 1989), Dean Butler and Don Goodspeed as Rapunzel's Prince, Susan Gordon Clark as Florinda, Teresa Burrell as Lucinda, Adam Grupper as the Steward, Cindy Robinson and 
Heather Shulman as Snow White, and Kay McClelland, Lauren Mitchell, Cynthia Sikes, and Mary Gordon Murray as the Baker's Wife.

In 1989, from May 23 to May 25 the full original cast (with the exception of Cindy Robinson as Snow White instead of Jean Kelly) reunited for three performances to tape the musical in its entirety for the Season 10 premiere episode of PBS’s American Playhouse, which first aired on March 15, 1991. The show was filmed professionally with seven cameras on the set of the Martin Beck Theater in front of an audience with certain elements changed from its standard production only slightly for the recording in order to better fit the screen rather than the stage such as the lighting, minor costume differences, and others. There were also pick up shots not filmed in front of an audience for various purposes. This video has since been released on VHS and DVD and on occasion, remastered and re-released.

Tenth Anniversary benefit performances were held on November 9, 1997, at the Broadway Theatre (New York), with most of the original cast. Original cast understudies Chuck Wagner and Jeff Blumenkrantz played the Wolf/Cinderella's Prince and the Steward in place of Robert Westenberg and Philip Hoffmann, while Jonathan Dokuchitz (who joined the Broadway production as an understudy in 1989) played Rapunzel's Prince in place of Wagner. This concert featured the duet "Our Little World," written for the first London production of the show.

On November 9, 2014, most of the original cast reunited for two reunion concerts and discussion in Costa Mesa, California. Mo Rocca hosted the reunion and interviewed Stephen Sondheim and James Lapine as well as each cast member. Appearing were Bernadette Peters, Joanna Gleason, Chip Zien, Danielle Ferland, Ben Wright and real life husband and wife, Robert Westenberg and Kim Crosby. The same group presented this discussion/concert on June 21, 2015, at the Brooklyn Academy of Music, New York City.

1988 US tour production
A United States tour started performances on November 22, 1988, the cast included Cleo Laine as the Witch,  Rex Robbins as the Narrator and Mysterious Man, Ray Gill and Mary Gordon Murray as the Baker and his Wife, Kathleen Rowe McAllen as Cinderella, Chuck Wagner as the Wolf/Cinderella’s Prince, Douglas Sills as Rapunzel’s Prince, Robert Duncan McNeill and Charlotte Rae as Jack and his Mother, Marcus Olson as the Steward, and Susan Gordon Clark reprising her role as Florinda from the Broadway production. The set was almost completely reconstructed, and there were certain changes to the script, changing certain story elements.

Cast replacements included Betsy Joslyn as the Witch, Peter Walker as the Narrator/Mysterious Man, James Weatherstone as the Wolf/Cinderella's Prince, Jonathan Hadley as Rapunzel's Prince, Marcus Olson as the Baker, who was then replaced by Adam Grupper (who understudied the role on Broadway), Judy McLane as the Baker's Wife, Nora Mae Lyng as Jack's Mother, who was then replaced by Frances Ford, Stuart Zagnit as the Steward, Jill Geddes as Cinderella, who was then replaced by Patricia Ben Peterson, and Kevin R. Wright as Jack.

The tour played cities around the country, such as Fort Lauderdale, Florida, Los Angeles, and Atlanta. The tour ran at the John F. Kennedy Center for the Performing Arts from June 1989 to July 16, 1989, with the reviewer for The Washington Post writing: "his lovely score – poised between melody and dissonance – is the perfect measure of our tenuous condition. The songs invariably follow the characters' thinking patterns, as they weigh their options and digest their experience. Needless to say, that doesn't make for traditional show-stoppers. But it does make for vivacity of another kind. And Sondheim's lyrics...are brilliant.... I think you'll find these cast members alert and engaging."

Original London production

The original West End production opened on September 25, 1990 at the Phoenix Theatre and closed on February 23, 1991 after 197 performances. It was directed by Richard Jones, and produced by David Mirvish, with set design by Richard Hudson, choreography by Anthony Van Laast, costumes by Sue Blane and orchestrations by Jonathan Tunick. The cast featured Julia McKenzie as the Witch, Ian Bartholomew as the Baker, Imelda Staunton as the Baker's Wife and Clive Carter as the Wolf/Cinderella's Prince. The show received seven Olivier Award nominations in 1991, winning for Best Actress in a Musical (Staunton) and Best Director of a Musical (Jones).

The song "Our Little World" was added. This song was a duet sung between the Witch and Rapunzel giving further insight into the care the Witch has for her self-proclaimed daughter and the desire Rapunzel has to see the world outside of her tower. The overall feel of the show was darker than that of the original Broadway production. Critic Michael Billington wrote, "But the evening's triumph belongs also to director Richard Jones, set designer Richard Hudson and costume designer Sue Blane who evoke exactly the right mood of haunted theatricality. Old-fashioned footlights give the faces a sinister glow. The woods themselves are a semi-circular, black-and-silver screen punctuated with nine doors and a crazy clock: they achieve exactly the 'agreeable terror' of Gustave Dore's children's illustrations. And the effects are terrific: doors open to reveal the rotating magnified eyeball or the admonitory finger of the predatory giant."

1998 London revival production
A new intimate production of the show opened (billed as the first London revival) at the Donmar Warehouse on 16 November 1998, closing on 13 February 1999. This revival was directed by John Crowley and designed by his brother, Bob Crowley. The cast included Clare Burt as the Witch, Nick Holder as the Baker, Sophie Thompson as the Baker's Wife, Jenna Russell as Cinderella, Sheridan Smith as Little Red Ridinghood, Damian Lewis as the Wolf/Cinderella’s Prince, and Frank Middlemiss as the Narrator. Russell later appeared as the Baker's Wife in the 2010 Regent's Park production. Thompson won the 1999 Olivier Award for Best Actress in a Musical for her performance, while the production itself was nominated for Outstanding Musical Production.

2002 Broadway revival production

A revival opened at the Ahmanson Theatre in Los Angeles, running from February 1, 2002 to March 24, 2002. This production was directed and choreographed with the same principal cast that later ran on Broadway.

The 2002 Broadway revival, directed by James Lapine and choreographed by John Carrafa, began previews on April 13, 2002 and opened April 30, 2002 at the Broadhurst Theatre, closing on December 29 after a run of 18 previews and 279 regular performances. It starred Vanessa Williams as the Witch, John McMartin as the Narrator/Mysterious Man, Stephen DeRosa as the Baker, Kerry O'Malley as the Baker's Wife, Gregg Edelman as the Wolf/Cinderella's Prince, Christopher Sieber as the Wolf/Rapunzel's Prince, Molly Ephraim as Little Red Ridinghood, Adam Wylie as Jack, and Laura Benanti as Cinderella. Judi Dench provided the pre-recorded voice of the Giant.

Lapine revised the script slightly for this production, with a cameo appearance of the Three Little Pigs restored from the earlier San Diego production. Other changes, apart from numerous small dialogue changes, included the addition of the song "Our Little World," a duet for the Witch and Rapunzel written for the first London production, the addition of a second Wolf in the song "Hello Little Girl" who competes for Little Red's attention with the first Wolf (Portrayed by the same actor playing Rapunzel's Prince), the portrayal of Jack's cow by a live performer (Chad Kimball) in an intricate costume and new lyrics were written for "Last Midnight," now a menacing lullaby sung by the Witch to the Baker's baby.

This production featured scenic design by Douglas W. Schmidt, costume design by Susan Hilferty, lighting design by Brian MacDevitt, sound design by Dan Moses Schreier and projection design by Elaine J. McCarthy. The revival won Tonys for the Best Revival of a Musical and Best Lighting Design. This Broadway revival wardrobe is on display at the Costume World in South Florida.

London Royal Opera House, 2007
A revival at the Royal Opera House's Linbury Studio in Covent Garden had a limited run from June 14 through June 30, 2007 followed by a short stint at The Lowry theatre, Salford Quays, Manchester between 4–7 July. The production mixed opera singers, musical theatre actors as well as film and television actors; including Anne Reid as Jack's Mother and Gary Waldhorn as the Narrator. The production itself, directed by Will Tuckett, was met with mixed reviews; although there were clear stand out performances.

The production completely sold out three weeks before opening. As this was an 'opera' production, the show and its performers were overlooked in the 'musical' nominations for the 2008 Laurence Olivier Awards. This production featured Suzie Toase (Little Red), Peter Caulfield (Jack), Beverley Klein (Witch), Anna Francolini (Baker's Wife), Clive Rowe (Baker), Nicholas Garrett (Wolf/Cinderella’s Prince), and Lara Pulver (Lucinda). This was the second Sondheim musical to be staged by the Opera House, following 2003's Sweeney Todd.

Regent's Park Open Air Theatre production, 2010
The Olivier Award-winning Regent's Park Open Air Theatre production, directed by Timothy Sheader and choreographed by Liam Steel, ran for a six-week limited season from 6 August to 11 September 2010. The cast included Hannah Waddingham as the Witch, Mark Hadfield as the Baker, Jenna Russell as the Baker's Wife, Helen Dallimore as Cinderella, Michael Xavier as the Wolf/Cinderella’s Prince, and Judi Dench as the recorded voice of the Giant. Gareth Valentine was the Musical Director. The musical was performed outdoors in a wooded area. Whilst the book remained mostly unchanged, the subtext of the plot was dramatically altered by casting the role of the Narrator as a young school boy lost in the woods following a family argument – a device used to further illustrate the musical's themes of parenting and adolescence.

The production opened to wide critical acclaim, much of the press commenting on the effectiveness of the open air setting. The Telegraph reviewer, for example, wrote: "It is an inspired idea to stage this show in the magical, sylvan surroundings of Regent's Park, and designer Soutra Gilmour has come up with a marvellously rickety, adventure playground of a set, all ladders, stairs and elevated walkways, with Rapunzel discovered high up in a tree." The New York Times reviewer commented: "The natural environment makes for something genuinely haunting and mysterious as night falls on the audience..." Stephen Sondheim attended twice, reportedly extremely pleased with the production. The production also won the Laurence Olivier Award for Best Musical Revival and Xavier was nominated for the Laurence Olivier Award for Best Performance in a Supporting Role in a Musical.

The production was recorded in its entirety, available to download and watch from Digital Theatre.

Central Park Delacorte Theater production, 2012
The Regent's Park Open Air Theatre production transferred to the Public Theater's 2012 summer series of free performances Shakespeare in the Park at the Delacorte Theater in Central Park, New York, with an American cast as well as new designers. Sheader again was the director and Steel served as co-director and choreographer. Performances were originally to run from July 24 (delayed from July 23 due to the weather) to August 25, 2012, but the show was extended till September 1, 2012. The cast included Amy Adams as the Baker's Wife, Donna Murphy as the Witch, Denis O'Hare as the Baker, Chip Zien (the original Baker in the 1987 Broadway cast) as the Mysterious Man/Cinderella's Father, Ivan Hernandez as the Wolf/Cinderella's Prince, Jessie Mueller as Cinderella, Jack Broderick as the young Narrator, Gideon Glick as Jack, Cooper Grodin as Rapunzel's Prince, Sarah Stiles as Little Red Ridinghood, Josh Lamon as the Steward, and Glenn Close as the Voice of the Giant. The set was a "collaboration between original Open Air Theatre designer Soutra Gilmour and...John Lee Beatty, [and] rises over 50 feet in the air, with a series of tree-covered catwalks and pathways." The production was dedicated to Nora Ephron, who had died earlier in 2012. In February 2012 and in May 2012, reports of a possible Broadway transfer surfaced with the production's principal actors in negotiations to reprise their roles. In January 2013, it was announced that the production will not transfer to Broadway due to scheduling conflicts.

Hollywood Bowl production, 2019
For its annual fully staged musical event, the Hollywood Bowl produced a limited run of Into the Woods from July 26–28, 2019, directed and choreographed by Robert Longbottom. The cast included Skylar Astin as the Baker, Sutton Foster as the Baker's Wife, Patina Miller as the Witch, Sierra Boggess as Cinderella, Cheyenne Jackson as the Wolf/Cinderella's Prince, Chris Carmack as Rapunzel's Prince, Gaten Matarazzo as Jack, Anthony Crivello as the Mysterious Man, Edward Hibbert as the Narrator, Shanice Williams as Little Red Ridinghood, Hailey Kilgore as Rapunzel, Rebecca Spencer as Jack's Mother, original Broadway cast member Gregory North as Cinderella’s Father, and Whoopi Goldberg as the voice of the Giant. The production featured Ann Hould-Ward's costumes from the Original Broadway Production.

2022 Encores! production
In November 2020, it was announced that New York City Center would stage Into the Woods as part of its Encores! series. In August 2021, it was announced that Christian Borle, Sara Bareilles, Ashley Park, and Heather Headley had joined the cast as, respectively, the Baker, his Wife, Cinderella, and the Witch. Park was initially scheduled to star in the Encores! production of Thoroughly Modern Millie, but it was canceled due to the COVID-19 pandemic. Headley had previously played the Witch at The Muny in 2015.

In December 2021, High School Musical: The Musical: The Series star Julia Lester joined the cast as Little Red Ridinghood, alongside Shereen Pimentel as Rapunzel, Jordan Donica as her Prince, and newcomer Cole Thompson as Jack. In March 2022, it was revealed that Denée Benton had replaced Park as Cinderella, with other cast members including Gavin Creel as the Wolf/Cinderella's Prince, Annie Golden as Cinderella's Mother/Granny/Giant's Wife, Ann Harada as Jack's Mother, David Patrick Kelly as the Narrator/Mysterious Man, Tiffany Denise Hobbs as Lucinda (later replaced by Ta'Nika Gibson), Brooke Ishibashi as Florinda, Kennedy Kanagawa as Milky White, Lauren Mitchell (who played Lucinda in the 1987 Broadway production) as Cinderella's Stepmother, and David Turner as the Steward. In April 2022, Neil Patrick Harris was announced as playing the Baker, replacing Borle due to a schedule conflict, Albert Guerzon also joined the cast as Cinderella's Father. Jason Forbach, Mary Kate Moore, and Cameron Johnson were the production’s swings.

The production ran from May 4–15, 2022 and was directed by Encores! artistic director Lear deBessonet. This was the final Encores! show to have Rob Berman conducting the Encores! orchestra.

2022 Broadway revival production

Fewer than two weeks after closing the limited engagement at Encores!, it was announced that the production would transfer to Broadway at the St. James Theatre, beginning performances on June 28, 2022; the production officially opened on July 10 and was initially set to run through August 21. Most of the Encores! cast transferred, with the additions of Brian d'Arcy James as the Baker, Patina Miller as the Witch, Phillipa Soo as Cinderella, and Joshua Henry as Rapunzel's Prince. Other new cast members included Nancy Opel as Cinderella's Stepmother, Aymee Garcia as Jack's Mother, Alysia Velez as Rapunzel, and Paul Kreppel, Diane Phelan, Alex Joseph Grayson, Felicia Curry, Delphi Borich, and Lucia Spina as understudies. From July 24 to August 2, Cheyenne Jackson temporarily filled in for Gavin Creel as the Wolf and Cinderella's Prince, reprising his roles from the Hollywood Bowl production. On July 18, 2022, Sara Bareilles revealed on her Instagram Stories that a cast album of this production was being recorded. During July, it was announced that the production had extended its run through October 16 of that year.

On August 4, 2022, it was announced that the entire Broadway cast would remain with the show through September 4 of that year. On September 6, real-life married couple Stephanie J. Block and Sebastian Arcelus replaced Bareilles and James as the Baker's Wife and  the Baker. Other replacements included Krysta Rodriguez as Cinderella, Katy Geraghty replacing Julia Lester as Little Red Ridinghood, and Jim Stanek replacing David Turner as the Steward. Montego Glover also began sharing the role of the Witch with Miller, and Andy Karl played a limited run as the Wolf/Cinderella's Prince from September 6–15 filling in for Creel. Ann Harada would join the cast reprising her role as Jack's Mother from the Encores! production on September 27. During that same month, it was announced that the production was given a final extension through January 8, 2023. On September 22, it was announced that James would return to the cast reprising his role as the Baker starting October 25, and Karl would return as well, this time playing Rapunzel’s Prince starting October 11. The cast album was released on September 30. On October 25, it was announced Denée Benton would join the cast reprising her role as Cinderella from the Encores! production on November 21 and left the production on December 24. On November 17, it was announced that Joaquina Kalukango would start playing the Witch from December 16 to the show’s closing date January 8. Karl's extended run ended December 2 for the return of Henry. On that same day the cast recording received a physical release on CD. On December 15, it was announced understudy Diane Phelan would take over the role of Cinderella on December 26 for the last two weeks of the show’s run. It was also announced that Arcelus would return to the production replacing James as the Baker starting January 3.

The Broadway production closed on January 8, 2023. The final Broadway cast was Kalukango as the Witch, Arcelus and Block as the Baker and his Wife, Creel as the Wolf/Cinderella’s Prince, Phelan as Cinderella, Cole Thompson as Jack, Geraghty as Little Red Ridinghood, Henry as Rapunzel’s Prince, David Patrick Kelly as the Narrator/Mysterious Man, Harada as Jack’s Mother, Opel as Cinderella’s Stepmother, Velez as Rapunzel, Stanek as the Steward, Annie Golden as Cinderella’s Mother/Granny/Giantess, Brooke Ishibashi as Florinda, Ta'Nika Gibson as Lucinda, Albert Guerzon as Cinderella’s Father/Puppeteer, Kennedy Kanagawa as Milky White/Puppeteer, and Jason Forbach, Mary Kate Moore, Cameron Johnson, Kreppel, Grayson, Curry, Borich, Spina, and Sam Simahk as understudies. The production's cast recording won the Grammy Award for Best Musical Theater Album. The recording is set for a vinyl release scheduled for March 17, 2023.

Theatre Royal, Bath, 2022
In December 2021, it was announced that a new production of Into the Woods would take place at the Theatre Royal in Bath for 4 weeks, starting on August 17. It is directed by Terry Gilliam and Leah Hausman, who already worked together for the staging of two operas by Berlioz at the English National Opera: The Damnation of Faust in 2011 and Benvenuto Cellini in 2014. The show was first booked for the Old Vic Theatre in 2020 but was delayed due to the COVID-19 pandemic and then canceled altogether. The cast included Julian Bleach as the Mysterious Man, Nicola Hughes as the Witch, Rhashan Stone as the Baker, Alex Young as the Baker's Wife, Nathanael Campbell as the Wolf and Cinderella’s Prince, Audrey Brisson as Cinderella, Barney Wilkinson as Jack, Gillian Bevan as Jack's Mother, Charlotte Jaconelli as Florinda, Maria Conneeley as Rapunzel, and Lauren Conroy as Little Red Ridinghood in her first professional stage debut. Milky White is played in pantomime by the dancer Faith Prendergast. The music director is Stephen Higgins and Jon Bausor is in charge of the production design and Anthony McDonald of the costumes.

In contrast to the Broadway revival occurring at the same time, this production is quite visual, with elaborate sets and props, the conceit of the show being that the characters are figures in a Victorian toy theatre, which a young girl is playing with. The toy theatre is taking full-stage with "giant" props (cans of beans, a watch, a vase, a doll...) appearing throughout and being used by the characters as elements of setting (for example Rapunzel's tower is a pile of bean cans). Also there's quite an accent on slapstick "done in the spirit of what Sondheim has written".

James Lapine and Stephen Sondheim supported this new vision, and Sondheim gave his approval for the cast before his passing. Besides, Sondheim discussed the production with the directors over Zoom during lockdown. Allegedly he liked what he saw so much that he fell off his chair laughing.

Terry Gilliam already met with Sondheim in the 90's for a film adaptation of the show that Paramount was supposed to produce, with Robin Williams and Emma Thompson as the Baker and Baker’s Wife, but Gilliam refused to do it because he thought the script wasn't as good as the original.

The show opened to overall positive reviews, critics praising this "hallucinogenic take", with its "imaginative imagery" and "sheer spectacle" and acclaiming Leah Hausman's "particularly crisp" choreography, while some regretted a lack of an "emotional connection between the characters and the audience" and feeling that "nothing quite develops its emotional power as much as it might". Yet all recognize the strength and the vocal talent of the cast. Special compliments often go to the "outstanding work" of Faith Prendergast as Milky White, The Guardian going as far as calling it "the most characterful presence" on the stage.

The show would then transfer to a West End theatre in late 2022 or early 2023.

2023 US tour production
On December 6, 2022, it was announced that the 2022 Broadway revival production would go on a tour of the United States in 2023. It stars Montego Glover as the Witch, Sebastian Arcelus and Stephanie J. Block as the Baker and his Wife, Gavin Creel as the Wolf/Cinderella's Prince, Cole Thompson as Jack, Katy Geraghty as Little Red Ridinghood, David Patrick Kelly as the Narrator/Mysterious Man, Nancy Opel as Cinderella’s Stepmother, Aymee Garcia as Jack’s Mother (From Boston onward), Ta’Nika Gibson as Lucinda, Brooke Ishibashi as Florinda, Jim Stanek as the Steward, Alysia Velez as Rapunzel, and Kennedy Kanagawa as Milky White/Puppeteer, all reprising their Broadway roles. On December 15, it was announced that Diane Phelan would reprise her role as Cinderella on tour. On January 17, the rest of the cast was announced, including Broadway understudies Jason Forbach and Felicia Curry being promoted to Rapunzel’s Prince and the Giant’s Wife/Cinderella’s Mother/Granny respectively. Other cast members included Rayanne Gonzales as Jack’s Mother (In Buffalo and Washington, D.C. only), Josh Breckenridge as Cinderella's Father/Puppeteer, and Paul Kreppel, Sam Simahk, Erica Durham, Ellie Fishman, Marya Grandy, Ximone Rose, and Eddie Lopez as understudies.

On January 31, it was announced the production was extending its Boston engagement by another week. It was also announced Arcelus and Block would not perform 6 days of the engagement. From February 25-26, Andy Karl reprised his Broadway role of Rapunzel's Prince during the opening weekend of the tour's engagement in Washington D.C. while Forbach stepped into the role of the Baker for Arcelus, who was recovering from an injury sustained earlier in the week. Forbach would end up filling in for Arcelus for over two weeks. On February 28, Forbach announced on his Instagram Stories he’d be playing the Baker during the 6 day absence of Arcelus in Boston. Understudy Sam Simahk played Rapunzel’s Prince in his place. On March 1, it was announced during "Wonderstudy Wednesday" on Instagram that understudy Ximone Rose would play the Baker's Wife during Block's absence in Boston.

The production is scheduled to tour the Shea's Performing Arts Center in Buffalo, NY, the Kennedy Center Opera House in Washington, D.C., the Emerson Colonial Theatre in Boston, MA, the Miller Theater in Philadelphia, PA, the Blumenthal Performing Arts Center in Charlotte, NC, the James M. Nederlander Theatre in Chicago, IL, the Curran Theater in San Francisco, CA, the Ahmanson Theatre in Los Angeles, CA, the Tennessee Performing Arts Center in Nashville, TN, and the Dr. Phillips Center in Orlando, FL.

Other productions
A production played in Sydney from 19 March 1993 to 5 June 1993 at the Drama Theatre, Sydney Opera House. It starred Judi Connelli as the Witch, Geraldine Turner as the Baker’s Wife, Tony Sheldon as the Baker, Philip Quast as the Wolf/Cinderella’s Prince, Pippa Grandison as Cinderella, and D. J. Foster as Rapunzel’s Prince. A Melbourne Theatre Company played from 17 January 1998 to 21 February 1998 at the Playhouse, Victorian Arts Centre. It starred Rhonda Burchmore as the Witch, John McTernan as the Baker, Gina Riley as the Baker’s Wife, Lisa McCune as Cinderella, Robert Grubb as the Wolf/Cinderella’s Prince, Peter Carroll as the Narrator/Mysterious Man, and Tamsin Carroll as Little Red Ridinghood.

In 2009, a production was done in Sacramento, California by the Wells Fargo Pavilion. It starred Yvette Cason as the Witch, Jeffry Denman as the Baker, Vicki Lewis as his Wife, Tracy Katz reprising her role as Little Red Ridinghood from the first national tour, Jason Forbach as the Wolf/Rapunzel's Prince, Gordon Goodman as Cinderella's Prince, Kim Huber as Cinderella, Matthew Wolpe as Jack, and Michael G. Hawkins as the Narrator/Mysterious Man.
 
The first professional Spanish language production, Dentro del Bosque, was produced by University of Puerto Rico Repertory Theatre and premiered in San Juan at Teatro de la Universidad (University Theatre) on March 14, 2013. The cast included Víctor Santiago as the Baker, Ana Isabelle as the Baker's Wife and Lourdes Robles as the Witch.

A 25th anniversary co-production between Baltimore's Center Stage and Westport Country Playhouse directed by Mark Lamos was notable for casting original Little Red Ridinghood, Danielle Ferland, as the Baker's Wife. The cast included Erik Liberman as the Baker, Lauren Kennedy as the Witch, Jeffry Denman as the Narrator, Nik Walker as the Wolf/Cinderella’s Prince, Dana Steingold as Little Red Ridinghood, Justin Scott Brown as Jack, Jenny Latimer as Cinderella, Cheryl Stern as Jack’s Mother, Robert Lenzi as Rapunzel’s Prince/Cinderella’s Father, Alma Cuervo as Cinderella’s Stepmother/Granny/Giant’s Wife, Britney Coleman as Rapunzel/Cinderella’s Mother, Nikka Lanzarone as Florinda, Eleni Delopoulos as Lucinda, and Jeremy Lawrence as the Mysterious Man. The production received 2011–2012 Connecticut Critics Circle Awards for Best Production, Best Ensemble, and Steingold's Little Red Ridinghood.

In 2014, a production premiered in Paris, France at the Paris' Théâtre du Châtelet from April 1–12. It starred Nicholas Garrett as the Baker, Francesca Jackson as Little Red Ridinghood, Kimy McLaren as Cinderella, Christine Buffle as the Baker's Wife, Beverley Klein as the Witch, Pascal Charbonneau and Rebecca de Pont Davies as Jack and his Mother, Damian Thantrey as the Wolf/Cinderella's Prince, David Curry as the Wolf/Rapunzel's Prince, Louise Alder as Rapunzel, and Fanny Ardant as the voice of the Giantess.

The Roundabout Theatre production, directed by Noah Brody and Ben Steinfeld, began performances Off-Broadway at the Laura Pels Theatre on December 19, 2014 in previews, officially on January 22, 2015, and closed on April 12, 2015. Like the original Broadway production 28 years prior, this production had a try-out run at the Old Globe Theatre in San Diego, California from July 12, 2014 – August 17, 2014 with the opening night taking place on July 17. This new version is completely minimalistically reimagined by the Fiasco Theater Company, featuring only ten actors playing multiple parts, and one piano accompanist. A national tour of this production began on November 29, 2016.

The DreamCatcher Theatre production opened in January 2015 and played a sold-out run at the Adrienne Arsht Center in Miami, Florida. Tituss Burgess starred as the Witch, the first male actor to do so. The cast also included Arielle Jacobs as the Baker's Wife, JJ Caruncho as the Baker, Justin John Moniz as the Wolf/Cinderella's Prince, Wayne LeGette as the Narrator/Mysterious Man, Annemarie Rosano as Cinderella, and Matthew Janisse as Rapunzel's Prince.

The musical had a production at The Muny in Forest Park, St. Louis, Missouri running from July 21 through 28 2015. The cast included Heather Headley (Witch), Erin Dilly (Baker's Wife), Rob McClure (Baker), Ken Page (Narrator), Elena Shaddow (Cinderella), Andrew Samonsky (Wolf/Cinderella’s Prince), Samantha Massell (Rapunzel), and Michael McCormick (Mysterious Man/Cinderella’s Father).

The Hart House Theatre production in Toronto, Ontario from January 15, 2016 to January 30, 2016 and February 9, 2023 to February 11, 2023. A production ran at the West Yorkshire Playhouse in Leeds in a collaboration with Opera North from 2 June 2016 to 25 June 2016.

The Israeli premiere of the musical, אל תוך היער (El Toch Ha-ya-ar), opened in Tel Aviv in August 2016 for a limited run produced by The Tramp Productions and Stuff Like That, starring Roi Dolev as the Witch, the second male actor to do so.

In 2019, Into the Woods was done by the Barrington Stage Company in Pittsfield, Massachusetts. It starred Mykal Kilgore as the Witch, Mara Davi as the Baker's Wife, Jonathan Raviv as the Baker, Pepe Nufrio as Rapunzel's Prince, Sarah Dacey Charles as Cinderella’s Stepmother/Granny/Cinderella’s Mother, Dorcas Leung as Little Red Ridinghood, Amanda Robles as Cinderella, Thom Sesma as the Narrator/Mysterious Man, Kevin Toniazzo-Naughton as the Wolf/Cinderella's Prince, Clay Singer as Jack, Zoë Aarts as Lucinda, Megan Orticelli as Florinda, and Leslie Becker as the Giant's Wife/Jack's Mother.

A 2022 production staged at Arkansas Repertory Theatre featured the pre-recorded voice of former Secretary of State and one-time Presidential nominee Hillary Clinton as the Giant.

In 2023, a production was done by Open Stage Theatre Company in Harrisburg, Pennsylvania.

Principal characters and casts
The original principal casts of notable stage productions of Into the Woods.

Notable replacements

Broadway (1987–89) 
The Witch: Nancy Dussault, Betsy Joslyn, Phylicia Rashad, Ellen Foley, Joy Franz (u/s), Marin Mazzie (u/s), Suzzanne Douglas (u/s), Lauren Vélez (u/s)
Cinderella: Patricia Ben Peterson, Pamela Winslow (u/s), Betsy Joslyn (u/s), Marin Mazzie (u/s), Cindy Robinson (u/s), Suzzanne Douglas (u/s)
Cinderella’s Prince: Chuck Wagner (u/s), Dean Butler (u/s)
The Wolf: Chuck Wagner (u/s), Dean Butler (u/s), Jonathan Dokuchitz (u/s)
Little Red Ridinghood: Jean Kelly (u/s), Cindy Robinson (u/s)
Jack: Jeff Blumenkrantz, Jonathan Dokuchitz (u/s)
The Narrator: Dick Cavett, Edmund Lyndeck (s/b)
The Mysterious Man: Edmund Lyndeck
Rapunzel’s Prince: Dean Butler, Jeff Blumenkrantz (u/s), Jonathan Dokuchitz (u/s)
Rapunzel: Marin Mazzie, Jean Kelly (u/s), Cindy Robinson (u/s)
The Steward: Jeff Blumenkrantz (u/s)

1st National Tour (1988-90) 
The Witch: Betsy Joslyn
The Baker: Stuart Zagnit (u/s)
Cinderella: Patricia Ben Peterson
Cinderella’s Prince: Douglas Sills (u/s)
The Narrator/The Mysterious Man: Peter Walker, Stuart Zagnit (u/s)
Cinderella’s Stepmother: Joy Franz
The Steward: Stuart Zagnit

1st Broadway Revival (2002) 
The Witch: Tracy Nicole Chapman (u/s)
Cinderella: Erin Dilly, Kate Reinders (u/s)
Cinderella’s Prince/The Wolf: Christopher Sieber (u/s)
Little Red Ridinghood: Kate Reinders (u/s)
Jack: Chad Kimball (u/s)
The Narrator/The Mysterious Man: Dennis Kelly (u/s)
The Wolf/Rapunzel’s Prince: Chad Kimball (u/s)
Jack’s Mother: Pamela Myers (u/s), Joy Franz (u/s)
Rapunzel: Kate Reinders (u/s)
Cinderella’s Stepmother: Joy Franz

2nd Broadway Revival (2022–23) 
The Witch: Montego Glover, Joaquina Kalukango
The Baker: Sebastian Arcelus, Jason Forbach (u/s), Jim Stanek (u/s)
The Baker's Wife: Stephanie J. Block
Cinderella: Krysta Rodriguez, Denée Benton
Cinderella's Prince/The Wolf: Cheyenne Jackson, Andy Karl, Jason Forbach (u/s)
The Narrator/The Mysterious Man: Paul Kreppel (u/s), Jason Forbach (u/s)
Rapunzel's Prince: Andy Karl, Jason Forbach (u/s)
Jack’s Mother: Ann Harada
The Steward: Jim Stanek, Paul Kreppel (u/s)

2nd National Tour (2023) 
The Baker: Jason Forbach, Jim Stanek (u/s)
The Narrator/The Mysterious Man: Paul Kreppel (s/b), Jim Stanek (u/s)
Rapunzel’s Prince: Andy Karl
The Steward: Paul Kreppel (u/s)

Additional performers 
The Witch: Gillian Bevan, Rhonda Burchmore, Tituss Burgess, Yvette Cason, Judi Connelli, Heather Headley, Nicola Hughes, Lauren Kennedy, Mykal Kilgore, Beth Leavel, Angela Robinson, Lourdes Robles, Lea Salonga, Rachel York
The Baker: Jeffry Denman, Hunter Foster, Nicholas Garrett, Neil Patrick Harris, Erik Liberman, Rob McClure, John McTernan, Victor Santiago, Tony Sheldon, Rhashan Stone
 The Baker’s Wife: Mara Davi, Erin Dilly, Danielle Ferland, Ana Isabelle, Arielle Jacobs, Vicki Lewis, Gina Riley, Geraldine Turner
Cinderella: Pippa Grandison, Lucy Maunder, Lisa McCune,  Elena Shaddow
Cinderella's Prince Jordan Donica, Kevin Earley, Tim Martin Gleason, Robert Grubb, Ryan Forde Iosco, Kenneth Marshall, Philip Quast, Drew Sarich, Hayden Tee
The Wolf: Jordan Donica, Kevin Earley, Jason Forbach, Tim Martin Gleason, Robert Grubb, Ryan Forde Iosco, Philip Quast, Drew Sarich, Hayden Tee
Little Red Ridinghood: Tamsin Carroll, Jennifer Cody, Francesca Jackson, Sharon Millerchip
Jack: Stanley Bahorek
The Narrator: Asher Angel, Peter Carroll, Jeffry Denman, Ken Page
The Mysterious Man: Julian Bleach, Peter Carroll, George Coe, Michael McCormick
Rapunzel’s Prince: Jonathan Dokuchitz, Jordan Donica, Tim Martin Gleason, Jolyon James
Jack’s Mother: Gillian Bevan, Cheryl Stern, Rebecca de Pont Davies
Rapunzel: Louise Alder, Samantha Massell
Cinderella’s Stepmother: Alma Cuervo, Susan Zelinsky
The Steward: Jeff Blumenkrantz
The Giant’s Wife: Fanny Ardant, Hillary Clinton, Alma Cuervo, Phylicia Rashad

Adaptations

Junior version
The musical has been adapted into a child-friendly version for use by schools and young companies, with the second act completely removed, as well as almost half the material from the first. The show is shortened from the original two and a half hours to fit in a 50-minute range, and the music transposed into keys that more easily fit young voices. It is licensed through Music Theatre International Broadway Junior musicals.

In 2019, a similar adaptation, Into the Woods Sr., adapted for performance by senior citizens in community centers and nursing homes, premiered. It will be available for license at a date to be announced.

Film

A theatrical film adaptation of the musical was produced by Walt Disney Pictures, directed by Rob Marshall, and starring Meryl Streep as the Witch, Emily Blunt as the Baker's Wife, James Corden as the Baker, Anna Kendrick as Cinderella, Chris Pine as Cinderella's Prince, Daniel Huttlestone as Jack, Lilla Crawford as Little Red Ridinghood, Tracey Ullman as Jack's Mother, Billy Magnussen as Rapunzel's Prince, Christine Baranski as Cinderella's Stepmother, MacKenzie Mauzy as Rapunzel, Tammy Blanchard as Florinda, and Johnny Depp as the Wolf. The film was released on December 25, 2014. It was a critical and commercial hit, grossing over $213 million worldwide. For her performance as the Witch, Streep was nominated for the Academy Award for Best Supporting Actress. The film also received Academy Award nominations for Best Production Design and Best Costume Design.

Analysis of book and music
In most productions of Into the Woods, including the original Broadway production, several parts are doubled. Cinderella's Prince and the Wolf, who share the characteristic of being unable to control their appetites, are usually played by the same actor. Similarly, so are the Narrator and the Mysterious Man, who share the characteristic of commenting on the story while avoiding any personal involvement or responsibility. Granny and Cinderella's Mother, who are both matriarchal characters in the story, are also typically played by the same person, who also gives voice to the nurturing but later murderous Giant's Wife.

The show covers multiple themes: growing up, parents and children, accepting responsibility, morality, and finally, wish fulfillment and its consequences. The Time Magazine reviewers wrote that the play's "basic insight... is at heart, most fairy tales are about the loving yet embattled relationship between parents and children. Almost everything that goes wrong—which is to say, almost everything that can—arises from a failure of parental or filial duty, despite the best intentions." Stephen Holden wrote that the themes of the show include parent-child relationships and the individual's responsibility to the community. The witch isn't just a scowling old hag, but a key symbol of moral ambivalence. James Lapine said that the most unpleasant person (the Witch) would have the truest things to say and the "nicer" people would be less honest. In the Witch's words: "I'm not good; I'm not nice; I'm just right."

Given the show's debut during the 1980s, the height of the US AIDS crisis, the work has been interpreted to be a parable about AIDS. In this interpretation, the Giant's Wife serves as a metaphor for HIV/AIDS, killing good and bad characters indiscriminately and forcing the survivors to band together to stop the threat and move on from the devastation, reflecting the devastation to many communities during the AIDS crisis. When asked about the thematic connection, Sondheim acknowledged that initial audiences interpreted it as an AIDS metaphor, but stated that the work was not intended to be specific.

The score is also notable in Sondheim's output, because of its intricate reworking and development of small musical motifs. In particular, the opening words, "I wish", are set to the interval of a rising major second and this small unit is both repeated and developed throughout the show, just as Lapine's book explores the consequences of self-interest and "wishing". The dialogue in the show is characterized by the heavy use of syncopated speech. In many instances, the characters' lines are delivered with a fixed beat that follows natural speech rhythms, but is also purposely composed in eighth, sixteenth, and quarter note rhythms as part of a spoken song. Like many Sondheim/Lapine productions, the songs contain thought-process narrative, where characters converse or think aloud.

Sondheim drew on parts of his troubled childhood when writing the show. In 1987, he told Time Magazine that the "father uncomfortable with babies [was] his father, and [the] mother who regrets having had children [was] his mother."

Awards and nominations

Original Broadway production

Original London production

1999 London revival

2002 Broadway revival

2010 London revival

2012 New York revival

2014 Australian production

2015 Off-Broadway production

2022 Broadway Revival

References

External links

 
Into the Woods 2012 lortel.org
Into the Woods 2015 lortel.org
 Libretto for Into the Woods
 Into the Woods on The Stephen Sondheim Reference Guide
 Illustrated Book of Into the Woods article, Sondheim.com (2004)
 Into the Woods at the Music Theatre International website
 Into the Woods JR. at the Music Theatre International website
 "Profile: Into the Woods", Ovrtur: International Database of Musicals

1987 musicals
Broadway musicals
Drama Desk Award-winning musicals
Musicals based on secular traditions
Laurence Olivier Award-winning musicals
Musicals by James Lapine
Musicals by Stephen Sondheim
West End musicals
Plays based on fairy tales
Works based on European myths and legends
Musicals based on works by Charles Perrault
Fantasy theatre
Tony Award-winning musicals
American Playhouse
Works based on Grimms' Fairy Tales